Serpil is a common feminine Turkish given name. It may refer to:

Given name
 Serpil Çapar (born 1981), Turkish handball player
 Serpil Hamdi Tüzün, Turkish male football coach
 Serpil İskenderoğlu (born 1982), Turkish handball player
 Serpil Timuray, Turkish chief executive
 Serpil Yassıkaya, Turkish boxer

Turkish feminine given names